is a Japanese former Nippon Professional Baseball infielder.

References 

1957 births
Living people
Baseball people from Kōchi Prefecture
Japanese baseball players
Nippon Professional Baseball infielders
Yakult Swallows players
Japanese baseball coaches
Nippon Professional Baseball coaches